Instruments used in surveying include:
 Alidade
 Alidade table
 Cosmolabe
 Dioptra
 Dumpy level
 Engineer's chain
 Geodimeter
 Graphometer
 Groma (surveying)
 Laser scanning
 Level
 Level staff
 Measuring tape
 Plane table
 Pole (surveying)
 Prism (surveying) (corner cube retroreflector)
 Prismatic compass (angle measurement)
 Ramsden surveying instruments
 Ranging rod
 Surveyor's chain
 Surveyor's compass
 Tachymeter (surveying)
 Tape (surveying)
 Tellurometer
 Theodolite
 Half theodolite
 Plain theodolite
 Simple theodolite
 Great theodolite
 Non-transit theodolite
 Transit theodolite
 Seconds theodolite
 Electronic theodolite
 Mining theodolite
 Suspension theodolite
 Traveling theodolite
 Pibal theodolite
 Registering theodolite
 Gyro-theodolite
 Construction theodolite
 Photo-theodolite
 Robotic theodolite
 Vernier theodolite
 Total station
 Transit (surveying)
 Tripod (surveying)
 Universal instrument (surveying)

See also 

 Astronomical instrument
 Measurement instrument

Further reading
 

Construction surveying
Historical scientific instruments